Mia Pharaoh is the third studio album by Miniature Tigers, and was released March 6, 2012.

Track list 
 "Sex on the Regular" – 3:31
 "Female Doctor" – 4:18
 "Cleopatra" – 3:48
 "Afternoons with David Hockney" – 3:58
 "Easy as All That" – 3:27
 "Flower Door" – 4:00
 "Boomerang" – 3:46
 "Ugly Needs" – 3:27
 "Angel Bath" – 4:32
 "Husbands & Wives" – 3:43
 "Pleasure Princess" – 4:34 (iTunes Exclusive)
 "Hologram Girl" – 3:58 (iTunes Exclusive)

Charts

References

2012 albums
Miniature Tigers albums